An annular solar eclipse occurred on September 1, 2016. A solar eclipse occurs when the Moon passes between Earth and the Sun, thereby totally or partly obscuring the image of the Sun for a viewer on Earth. An annular solar eclipse occurs when the Moon's apparent diameter is smaller than the Sun's, blocking most of the Sun's light and causing the Sun to look like an annulus (ring). An annular eclipse appears as a partial eclipse over a region of the Earth thousands of kilometres wide. In this case, annularity was observed in Gabon, Congo, Democratic Republic of the Congo, Tanzania, Mozambique, Madagascar, and Reunion.

Visibility 

Animated Path

Images

Related eclipses

Eclipses of 2016 
 A total solar eclipse on March 9.
 A penumbral lunar eclipse on March 23.
 A penumbral lunar eclipse on August 18.
 An annular solar eclipse on September 1.
 A penumbral lunar eclipse on September 16.

Solar eclipses ascending node 2015-2018 

 Saros 125: Partial Solar Eclipse September 13, 2015
 Saros 135: Annular Solar Eclipse September 1, 2016
 Saros 145: Total Solar Eclipse August 21, 2017
 Saros 155: Partial Solar Eclipse August 11, 2018

Solar eclipses from 2015 to 2018

Saros 135 

It is a part of Saros cycle 135, repeating every 18 years, 11 days, containing 71 events. The series started with partial solar eclipse on July 5, 1331. It contains annular eclipses from October 21, 1511 through February 24, 2305, hybrid eclipses on March 8, 2323 and March 18, 2341 and total eclipses from March 29, 2359 through May 22, 2449. The series ends at member 71 as a partial eclipse on August 17, 2593. The longest duration of totality will be 2 minutes, 27 seconds on May 12, 2431.

Metonic series

Notes

References

 Annular solar eclipse of September 1, 2016

2016 9 1
2016 in science
2016 09 01
September 2016 events